Oscar Ray Grimes Jr. (April 13, 1915 – May 19, 1993) was a utility infielder in Major League Baseball who played for the Cleveland Indians (1938–1942), New York Yankees (1943–1946) and Philadelphia Athletics (1946). Grimes batted and threw right-handed.

He was born in Minerva, Ohio.

In a nine-season career, Grimes posted a .256 batting average with 18 home runs and 200 RBI in 602 games played. 
 
Grimes died in Westlake, Ohio, at the age of 78. He played semi-pro football for the Minerva Merchants.

Personal

His father Ray Grimes and his uncle Roy Grimes also played in the major leagues.

See also
List of second-generation Major League Baseball players

External links

Baseball Almanac
Baseball Library

1915 births
1993 deaths
American League All-Stars
Cleveland Indians players
New York Yankees players
Philadelphia Athletics players
Major League Baseball infielders
Baseball players from Ohio
People from Minerva, Ohio
Major League Baseball third basemen
Major League Baseball second basemen
Major League Baseball first basemen
Butler Indians players
Zanesville Greys players
New Orleans Pelicans (baseball) players
Milwaukee Brewers (minor league) players
Toronto Maple Leafs (International League) players
Montreal Royals players
St. Paul Saints (AA) players
Greenville Spinners players